Jeffrey Weissman (born October 2, 1958) is an American actor. He has appeared in dozens of motion pictures and TV shows, most notably as George McFly in Back to the Future Part II and III and as Teddy Conway in Pale Rider. He has guest starred spots on Scarecrow and Mrs. King, Max Headroom, Dallas, The Man Show, and with Dick Van Dyke on Diagnosis: Murder and as Screech's Guru on Saved by the Bell.

Weissman is a teacher of commedia dell'arte and film technique, with students including both professionals and newcomers to the arts. He also teaches acting for film, directing, writing and improv at San Francisco School of Digital Film Making.

Background
Jeffrey Weissman trained in acting and performance at American Conservatory Theater, San Francisco State University, UCLA and Santa Monica City College. His comedic experience includes work with The Second City alumni, Los Angeles Theater Sports, Andy Goldberg and Bill Hudnutt Sitcom Workshops, (formerly Harvey Lembeck). He also trained at Berkeley Rep. in the "Finding the Inner Imp" with Ron Campbell and participated in acting workshops with Peter Flood, Jackie Benton, and Magic Theater Gym.  He has trained in dance, movement, storytelling workshops with the Voice of Men In Motion.  He also trained under Jackie Benton, Peter Flood, and Bill Hudnut, and was a Varsity Player with Los Angeles Theatersports.

Career
Jeffrey Weissman has worked in commercials, television shows, and feature films, and is probably best known for his portrayal of the role of George McFly in the two Back to the Future sequels, taking over the role from Crispin Glover, who declined. For the role, Weissman wore extremely heavy makeup to have him resemble Glover, and most of his scenes were shot with him either upside down or in the background (which led to Glover suing the producers for using his likeness without his permission).

He has appeared in roles in feature films including Pale Rider and Twilight Zone: The Movie. He has also made guest appearances on television shows such as Saved by the Bell, The Man Show, Dallas, Max Headroom, Scarecrow and Mrs. King, Chip and Pepper's Cartoon Spectacular, and Divorce Court. His commercial credits include an interactive television commercial for Ameritech and a Christmas commercial for the grocery chain Publix.

Jeffrey has done ADR and looping on dozens of projects; Heathers, Loverboy, The Best Times, Crime of Innocence, Pale Rider, Hot Resort, and others.

He has directed for Universal Studios in Japan,  and he was artistic director of the ‘Flying Penguins’ improv comedy group, (helping to form the highly acclaimed Los Angeles Theater Sports, now in its 18th year).  He has recently been teaching theater games to training teachers at Dominican College, commedia dell'arte & "The Business of Acting" at Sonoma State University, as well as "Kidprov" & "Teenprov" workshops & shows at various libraries in Marin County and South San Francisco.

Filmography

Feature films
1983 Twilight Zone: The Movie  as Young Husband
1984 Johnny Dangerously as Tee Shirt Vendor
1984 Crackers as Backstage Dancer
1985 Pale Rider as Teddy Conway
1989 Back to the Future Part II  as George Douglas McFly
1990 Back to the Future Part III as George Douglas McFly
1991 For the Boys as the North Africa Stage Manager
2001 To Protect & To Serve as Jean Goddard
2001 2001: A Space Travesty as Groucho
2001 Max Keeble's Big Move as McGoogles (bodysuit)
2004 Slapdash as Mosley
2005 Return to Sender as Old Comic
2005 Angels with Angles as Groucho
2006 Night Fliers as Lee Hawthorn
2006 Car Babes as Jay
2006 Looking Back at the Future (documentary) as himself
2007 Hats Off as Dr. Ball
2008 corked as Jerry Hannon
2008 Our Feature Presentation as Hugo Wilmington
2009 American Disciples as Dr Garownski
2010 Chateau Meroux as Roy Hutchinson
2015 The Boat Builder as Bud

Guest appearances
1984 Scarecrow and Mrs. King: "Filming Raoul"
1985 Dallas: "Lovers and Other Strangers"
1987 Max Headroom: "Rakers"
198? Divorce Court: "Cott Vs. Cott"
1991 Saved By the Bell: "Rockumentary"
1992 NBC Cartoon Spectacular: "Chip and Pepper"
2000 Diagnosis: Murder: "Two Birds With One Sloan"
2002 The Man Show: "Assoholics Anonymous"
2020 The Show Must Go Online: "Twelfth Night"

Mini-series
1994 The Stand
2000 The '70s

Short films
1996 He's Dead, But He Won't Lie Down 
1997 Garbage 
1998 god@heaven
2003 Touched 
2007 Edible as Father
2008 We Missed You, Pete 
2011 Kosher

Theatre
1998 Tallulah (Hollywood)
2004 Tony Kushner's The Illusion (Cinnabar Theater)
2005 Mellisa Gibson's "[sic]" (6th St. Playhouse/Sonoma Actor's Theatre)
2005 Wm. Shakespeare's "12th Night"
2006 Tease-O-Rama Baggy Trouser Blackout Comedy, at Bimbo's 365 Club
2006 Just For Laughs (SF Fringe Festival)
2007 Just For Laughs (fundraiser establishing a Theater Department Schoarship at OSU)

References

External links

 Official website
 

1958 births
American male film actors
American male stage actors
American male television actors
Living people